Albert Onyeawuna (died 21 April 2014) was a Nigerian footballer.

He played club football for Port Harcourt, and also made 26 appearances for the Nigerian national team between 1955 and 1964, scoring 7 goals.

References

1930s births
2014 deaths
Nigerian footballers
Nigeria international footballers
1963 African Cup of Nations players
Association footballers not categorized by position